Diaspora is a "Hard" Sci-fi role-playing game based on the FATE engine from Evil Hat Productions.

History
VSCA Publishing of Canada released the first edition of the science-fiction game, Diaspora in 2009. The game used the third-edition of FATE. Diaspora was one of the FATE games to include a method for players to create a campaign by working together, and its rules for creating new worlds in space collaboratively were extensive. Fred Hicks considered Diaspora one of his favorites, and used his Evil Hat Productions to republish the game in 2010 to release it into wider distribution.

Reception
M Harold Page reviewed Diaspora for Black Gate, and stated that "Buy Diaspora if you want to enjoy exploring a Hard Science Fiction universe and don't have much patience for fat rule books and fiddly minutiae."

Diaspora won the 2010 Gold ENnie Award for "Best Rules".

References

ENnies winners
Evil Hat Productions games
Role-playing games introduced in 2009
Science fiction role-playing games